Enrico Musolino (29 August 1928 – 14 February 2010) was an Italian speed skater. He competed at the 1948 Winter Olympics and the 1952 Winter Olympics.. He last competed on 1 March 1962.

References

1928 births
2010 deaths
Italian male speed skaters
Olympic speed skaters of Italy
Speed skaters at the 1948 Winter Olympics
Speed skaters at the 1952 Winter Olympics
Sportspeople from Milan